The Alexandria International is a women's squash tournament held in Alexandria, Egypt in June. It is part of the Women's PSA World Series, the highest level of women's professional squash competition.

Past results

See also
 Squash in Egypt
 El Gouna International

References

External links
- 2015 Squashsite page

PSA World Tour
WSA World Tour
Squash tournaments in Egypt
Squash in Egypt
Women's squash tournaments